Sugagawa Dam is a gravity dam located in Ehime Prefecture in Japan. The dam is used for flood control and water supply. The catchment area of the dam is 14 km2. The dam impounds about 22  ha of land when full and can store 3050 thousand cubic meters of water. The construction of the dam was started on 1969 and completed in 1975.

References

Dams in Ehime Prefecture
1975 establishments in Japan